Simone Raineri (born 7 February 1977 in Bozzolo, Mantua) is an Italian competition rower and Olympic champion.

He received a gold medal in quadruple sculls at the 2000 Summer Olympics in Sydney, together with Agostino Abbagnale, Rossano Galtarossa, and Alessio Sartori.

References

External links
 

1977 births
Living people
Italian male rowers
Olympic rowers of Italy
Olympic gold medalists for Italy
Olympic silver medalists for Italy
Rowers at the 2000 Summer Olympics
Rowers at the 2004 Summer Olympics
Rowers at the 2008 Summer Olympics
Rowers at the 2012 Summer Olympics
Olympic medalists in rowing
Medalists at the 2008 Summer Olympics
World Rowing Championships medalists for Italy
Medalists at the 2000 Summer Olympics
Mediterranean Games gold medalists for Italy
Competitors at the 2005 Mediterranean Games
Sportspeople from the Province of Mantua
Mediterranean Games medalists in rowing
Rowers of Fiamme Gialle
European Rowing Championships medalists